The Asian Development Bank Institute (ADBI) is an Asian think tank focused on identifying effective development strategies for Asia and the Pacific, and on providing support to ADB member countries in managing development challenges. It was established in Tokyo in 1996 as a subsidiary of Asian Development Bank, with initial and subsequent financing from the Government of Japan. ADBI is located on the 8th floor of the Kasumigaseki Building in Kasumigaseki, Chiyoda, Tokyo. ADBI was ranked 1st in the world among government-affiliated think tanks in the 2020 Global Go To Think Tanks Index Report by the Think Tanks and Civil Societies Program of the University of Pennsylvania.

Origins
In May 1996, at the twenty-ninth annual meeting of the Asian Development Bank (ADB), the Government of Japan offered to cover the cost of operating and establishing the ADB Institute to address the needs for strengthening the capacity of public and other developmental institutions in developing member countries (DMCs). The proposal was approved on 24 September 1996 and the institute was officially inaugurated in Tokyo on 10 December 1997.

The first Dean of the ADB Institute was the leading Filipino economist Jesus Estanislao.

Operations
ADBI is a subsidiary body of ADB.  The ADB Board of Governors exercises the same oversight responsibilities over ADBI as for the rest of ADB, including approval for its work program and budget. In 2007 Government of Japan provided $14.2 million for ADBI under its Institute Special Fund scheme.

ADBI's work covers applied research, policy seminars designed to disseminate thinking about best practices, and a range of capacity building and training (CBT) initiatives.

References

External links
 ADBInstitute Home Page
 Asia Pathways - ADBI Blog
 ADBI E-Learning
 ADBI Podcast
 Think-Asia - portal to serve over 100 think tanks institutions in free association
 Think20 (T20)

1996 establishments in Japan
Think tanks based in Japan
Think tanks established in 1996